National Highway 329A, commonly called 329A is a national highway in  India. It is a spur road of National Highway 329.  NH-329A traverses the states of Assam and Nagaland in India.

Route 
Diphu – Pimpla.

Junctions  

  Terminal near Diphu.
  Terminal near Pimpla.

See also 
 List of National Highways in India by highway number
 List of National Highways in India by state

References

External links 

 NH 329A on OpenStreetMap

National highways in India
National Highways in Assam
National Highways in Nagaland